Stig Andersen (1914 - 28 August 1991) was a Danish philatelist who signed the Roll of Distinguished Philatelists in 1980.

References

Danish philatelists
Signatories to the Roll of Distinguished Philatelists
1914 births
1991 deaths